The Magus, or Celestial Intelligencer is a handbook of the occult and ceremonial magic compiled by occultist Francis Barrett published in 1801.

Contents and Sources
Much of the material was actually collected by Barrett from older occult handbooks, as he hints in the preface:

We have collected out of the works of the most famous magicians, such as Zoroaster, Hermes, Apollonius, Simon of the Temple, Trithemius, Agrippa, Porta (the Neapolitan), Dee, Paracelsus, Roger Bacon, and a great many others...

In fact, most of the material comes from Agrippa's Three Books of Occult Philosophy and Pietro d'Abano's Heptameron.

Previous demonologists such as Binsfeld (1589) had drawn up lists that comprised a hierarchy of devils, and attributed them with the power to instigate people to commit the seven deadly sins. Lucifer was associated with Pride, Satan with Anger and so forth. In The Magus Barrett altered the "roster of devils" and Satan now became a prince of deluders (serving conjurers and witches).

Publication and influence
The book was originally published with two books in a single volume, as was common with many texts of this period. It facilitated the modern revival of magic by making information from otherwise rare books more readily available. It may have influenced novelist Edward Bulwer-Lytton and occultist Eliphas Levi.

Even farther afield, some have speculated on long chains of influence from various religious texts including, through Masonry, to Joseph Smith, founder of the Latter-day Saint movement. While the talk has no actual mention of The Magus, Reed C. Durham, Jr.'s speech "Is There No Help for the Widow's Son?" does list several traditionally occult figures. The Latter-day Saint-themed art collective ARCH-HIVE (active 2017–) relied on The Magus as one of its sources in its imagining of Mormon spells.

See also
Ceremonial magic
Classification of demons
Christian angelic hierarchy

References

External links
 The Magus online
 Archive.org: The Magus 

1801 non-fiction books
Occult books